Antonio Laserna and Santander (1752, Colindres, Cantabria – 1823) was a Spanish bibliographer and writer.

References

1752 births
1823 deaths
People from the Eastern Coast of Cantabria
Writers from Cantabria
Spanish writers in French